Michael J. Cleary C.S.Sp. (1 September 1925 – 3 September 2020) was an Irish prelate, Roman Catholic Bishop Emeritus of the Diocese of Banjul, Gambia.  He was born in Brickens, County Mayo, Ireland. He was educated at St Jarlath's College, Tuam, before entering the novitiate where he also studied for an arts degree in University College Dublin.

He was ordained a priest on 29 June 1952 for the Congregation of the Holy Spirit.  On 24 January 1981, he was appointed Bishop of the Diocese of Banjul, and ordained on 24 March 1981.  The principal consecrator was Archbishop Johannes Dyba; his principal co-consecrators were Archbishop Joseph Ganda, and Bishop Michael Joseph Moloney. Cleary retired on 25 February 2006, although he spent a further 9 years in Gambia. He spent his last years at the Holy Ghost Fathers retirement home in the Kimmage Manor campus, Dublin.

References

1925 births
2020 deaths
Irish expatriates in the Gambia
Irish expatriate Catholic bishops
Christian clergy from County Mayo
Presidents of Inter-territorial Catholic Bishops' Conference of The Gambia and Sierra Leone
20th-century Roman Catholic bishops in the Gambia
21st-century Roman Catholic bishops in the Gambia
Holy Ghost Fathers
Irish Spiritans
Alumni of University College Dublin
Roman Catholic bishops of Banjul
People educated at St Jarlath's College